Evan Schwartz (born October 27, 1987) is an American soccer player.

Career

Europe
Born in Steamboat Springs, Colorado, Schwartz began his youth career at IMG Academy and  went on to play for the Chicago Fire Super 20 side. After not receiving interest from Major League Soccer sides Schwartz left the United States for Iceland and signed with Third Level side Afturelding. He helped the club gain promotion to 1. deild karla, the second division in the Icelandic football league system. His play with Afturelding led to Schwartz receiving interest from several Úrvalsdeild clubs, and he subsequently signed with Breiðablik UBK in 2009. In 2012, he signed with Vikingur R, starting 24 games and tallying 3 goals and 11 assists.

United States
Having suffered through several injuries Schwartz saw limited playing time with Breiðablik, and returned to the United States in 2010. He signed with the Dayton Dutch Lions in the USL Premier Development League, establishing himself as the club's starting right back during the 2010 season. Schwartz was noted for his attacking prowess from his right back position and began to draw interest from several Major League Soccer clubs including Toronto FC, Colorado Rapids and New England Revolution. Schwartz re-signed with Dayton, now part of the USL Pro league, on March 31, 2011.

Honours
Breiðablik UBK
Icelandic Cup: 2009

References

External links
 Dayton Dutch Lions profile
 blikar.is
 
 

1987 births
Living people
American soccer players
Association football defenders
Evan Schwartz
Dayton Dutch Lions players
USL League Two players
USL Championship players
People from Steamboat Springs, Colorado